Wild Youth are an Irish indie rock band formed in Dublin in 2016, consisting of members David Whelan, Conor O'Donohoe, Ed Porter and Callum McAdam. They are set to represent Ireland in the Eurovision Song Contest 2023 with the song "We Are One".

Career 
Wild Youth was founded in 2016 in Dublin, by members Conor O'Donohoe, Callum McAdam, Ed Porter and David Whelan. The members write and produce their songs alone.  Their debut single, "All Or Nothing", was released in May 2017. A number of tracks were released after it, which became hits in Ireland. Following its success, the band went on joint tours with Lewis Capaldi and Westlife. In 2019, their first mini-album, The Last Goodbye, was released.

They participated in Eurosong 2023 with the song "We Are One". They came in first place with 34 points and thus they will represent Ireland in the Eurovision Song Contest 2023. They will perform the song in the first semi-final on 9 May.

Discography

Mini-albums

Singles

References

Living people
Eurovision Song Contest entrants of 2023
Eurovision Song Contest entrants for Ireland
Irish indie rock groups
Year of birth missing (living people)